The 2004–05 South Pacific cyclone season was an above-average season in which tropical cyclones formed within the South Pacific Ocean to the east of 160°E. The season officially ran from November 1, 2004 to April 30, 2005, however a tropical cyclone could form at any time between July 1, 2004 and June 30, 2005 and would count towards the season total. The season got off to an early start, when Tropical Depression 01F developed near the Solomon Islands on October 28, three days before the official start of the season. The final disturbance of the season dissipated as the season was drawing to a close on May 1. The season was above-average in terms of activity, with 9 tropical cyclones and 5 severe tropical cyclones forming during the season. The season featured Cyclone Percy, the most intense of the season in terms of pressure.

During the season, tropical cyclones are officially monitored by the Fiji Meteorological Service (FMS), Australian Bureau of Meteorology (BOM) and New Zealand's MetService. The United States Armed Forces through the Joint Typhoon Warning Center (JTWC) also monitors the basin and issue unofficial warnings for American interests. The FMS attaches a number and an F suffix to tropical disturbances that form in or move into the basin while the JTWC designates significant tropical cyclones with a number and a P suffix. The FMS, BoM and MetService all use the Australian Tropical Cyclone Intensity Scale and estimate wind speeds over a period of ten minutes, while the JTWC estimated sustained winds over a 1-minute period, which are subsequently compared to the Saffir–Simpson hurricane wind scale (SSHWS).

Seasonal summary 

The first tropical depression of the season developed on October 28 to the northeast of Guadalcanal in the Solomon Islands. Over the next few days the system moved westwards and moved into the Australian region during October 30. There were no significant tropical disturbances observed during November, before Tropical Depression 02F developed to the north of Vanuatu during December 3. The system subsequently meandered over the ocean between Vanuatu and Fiji, before it was last noted to the southeast of Vanuatu during December 14. While Tropical Depression 02F was active, the third tropical depression of the season, developed to the south of Tuvalu on December 5. The system subsequently moved south-eastwards, before it was last noted during December 10 to the east of Nuku'alofa, Tonga. The fourth tropical disturbance of the season developed during December 21 and subsequently moved south-westwards, before it was named Judy during December 24, as it developed into the first tropical cyclone of the season.

Systems

Tropical Cyclone Judy 

On December 21, RSMC Nadi reported that Tropical Disturbance 04F had developed, along an active and slow-moving monsoon trough near French Polynesia. The depression was in an area of high shear, with the deep convection located to the northeast of the center. The low level circulation center at this time was exposed but was developing despite the high shear associated with the system. Early on December 24 deep convection associated with the system moved over the low level circulation center whilst the system was getting better organized. During the next few hours under strengthening shear, Judy struggled to maintain itself. However, as it moved further to the south it came under a strengthening steering field which was being enhanced by a trough of low pressure to the west of the steering field which helped to neutralize the effect of the shear over the cyclone. Judy then intensified slightly further and reached its peak intensity of 85 km/h (50 mph), with a peak pressure of 989 hPa late on December 25 whilst turning towards the south towards TCWC Wellington's area of responsibility. Judy degenerated into an extratropical cyclone during December 27, before it was last noted later that day as it merged with an area of low pressure to the south of Tahiti.

Severe Tropical Cyclone Kerry 

Kerry moved to the southwest with  winds as it moved over Vanuatu. Once past the island, Kerry moved on a west-southwest course and it began to intensify after turning to the west. The storm reached a peak intensity of  before turning towards the south-southeast. The storm began to weaken under vertical shear and was downgraded to a depression on January 13.

Tropical Cyclone Lola 

Severe Tropical Cyclone Meena 

On February 1, the RSMC Nadi began monitoring a tropical disturbance, which they designated as 07F, to the west of the Northern Cook Islands. The next day, a small area of deep convection developed.

Severe Tropical Cyclone Olaf 

The most intense system of the season, Tropical Cyclone Olaf developed rapidly like Nancy. However bad the damage was, it could have been worse as Olaf veered east, its eyewall missing the islands.

Severe Tropical Cyclone Nancy 

Cyclone Nancy formed on February 10 as Tropical Disturbance 09F, over the next couple of days. During that day Nancy started to rapidly intensify becoming a Severe Tropical Cyclone late on February 13 as a small, irregularly shaped, eye had begun to develop.

The next day both RSMC Nadi, and the JTWC reported that Cyclone Nancy had attained its peak intensity of 175 km/h (110 mph 10-minute winds) and 230 km/h (145 mph 1-minute winds). Increasing wind shear then caused Nancy to weaken. Early on February 15, the storm passed directly over Manuae. Continued weakening took place as a trough of low pressure approached from the southwest. By February 16, Nancy weakened below hurricane intensity and turned to the southwest as it began to undergo a Fujiwhara interaction with Cyclone Olaf, strong shear associated with the outflow of Cyclone Olaf caused all convection associated with Nancy to be displaced to the southwest on February 16. Early on February 17, Nancy transitioned into an extratropical cyclone as it entered the area of responsibility of TCWC Wellington. Shortly afterwards, the low was absorbed into the larger circulation of Olaf however it was monitored by TCWC Wellington as a separate system until 1200 UTC on February 18.

Already impacted by Cyclone Meena a week earlier, the Cook Islands sustained significant damage from Cyclone Nancy. Several homes were damaged and destroyed throughout the islands. Downed trees and power lines blocked roads and cut power and minor flooding was reported along coastal areas.

Severe Tropical Cyclone Percy 

Percy quickly formed from an area of low pressure on February 24 and reached Category 1  status north of American Samoa. The cyclone then moved eastward, peaking at Category 5  status before turning southward. Percy then passed through the southwestern Cook Islands causing severe damage before dissipating.

Tropical Cyclone Rae

Tropical Depression 13F 

Late on February 27, RSMC Nadi reported that a suspect tropical disturbance was developing near to the north of Rennel Island, in the Solomon Islands. Over the next couple of days the system gradually developed and before it was declared as a tropical disturbance early on March 1. At this time convection detached from the disturbance's low level circulation center, whilst vertical wind shear around the system remained weak. Early the next day, the Disturbance was then relocated to the northwest of Viti Levu in Fiji, before it was designated as Tropical Depression 13F later that day. The Depression remained weak reaching an estimated central pressure of 1001 hPa (mbar) early on March 3, however there were no winds reported by RSMC Nadi whilst they were monitoring it. RSMC Nadi then issued their last advisory on 13F early on March 4 after no persistent convection reported around the system since the depression reached its peak pressure.

Tropical Depression 14F

Tropical Cyclone Sheila

Other systems 
Over the next couple of days the system moved westwards and moved into the Australian region, during October 30, where it was monitored for a few days by TCWC Brisbane. Over the next week the poorly organised system meandered over the ocean between Vanuatu and Fiji, before it started to organise during December 12, with RSMC Nadi issuing gale warnings on the system. The system subsequently moved southwards between Vanuatu and Fiji, before it was last noted during December 14, while it was located to the southeast of Port Villa. While Tropical Depression 02F was active, the third tropical depression of the season, developed to the south of Tuvalu on December 5. The system subsequently moved south-eastwards, before it was last noted during December 10 to the east of Nuku'alofa, Tonga.

During February 26, RSMC Nadi reported that Tropical Depression 11F had formed, within the Tuamotu Archipelago of islands in French Polynesia. During the next day the system moved eastwards before it was last noted during the next day as it degenerated into a tropical disturbance.

During April 21, the disturbance moved towards the southwest and affected Niue while starting to rapidly weaken, before it was last noted during April 22 wrapping into Cyclone Sheila's circulation.

Over the next 24 hours the system moved towards the southeast while deep convection surrounding the system failed to become organized and started to weaken.

Season effects 
This table lists all the storms that developed in the South Pacific to the east of longitude 160°E during the 2004–05 season. It includes their intensity on the Australian Tropical cyclone intensity scale, duration, name, landfalls, deaths, and damages. All data is taken from RSMC Nadi and/or TCWC Wellington, and all of the damage figures are in 2005 USD.

|-
|  ||  || bgcolor=#| || bgcolor=#| || bgcolor=#| || || || ||
|-
|  ||  || bgcolor=#| || bgcolor=#| || bgcolor=#| || || || ||
|-
|  ||  || bgcolor=#| || bgcolor=#| || bgcolor=#| || || || ||
|-
|  ||  || bgcolor=#| || bgcolor=#| || bgcolor=#| || || || ||
|-
|  ||  || bgcolor=#| || bgcolor=#| || bgcolor=#| || || || ||
|-
|  ||  || bgcolor=#| || bgcolor=#| || bgcolor=#| || || || ||
|-
|  ||  || bgcolor=#| || bgcolor=#| || bgcolor=#| || Cook Islands ||  || None ||
|-
|  ||  || bgcolor=#| || bgcolor=#| || bgcolor=#| || Samoan Islands, Cook Islands ||  || None ||
|-
|  ||  || bgcolor=#| || bgcolor=#| || bgcolor=#| || Samoan Islands, Cook Islands || || None ||
|-
|  ||  || bgcolor=#| || bgcolor=#| || bgcolor=#| || Tokelau, Samoan Islands, Cook Islands ||  || None ||
|-
|  ||  || bgcolor=#| || bgcolor=#| || bgcolor=#| || French Polynesia || None || None ||
|-
|  ||  || bgcolor=#| || bgcolor=#| || bgcolor=#| || No areas affected || None || None ||
|-
|  ||  || bgcolor=#| || bgcolor=#| || bgcolor=#| || || || ||
|-
|  ||  || bgcolor=#| || bgcolor=#| || bgcolor=#| || || || ||
|-
|  ||  || bgcolor=#| || bgcolor=#| || bgcolor=#| || || || ||
|-
|  ||  || bgcolor=#| || bgcolor=#| || bgcolor=#| || Niue || || ||
|-
|  ||  || bgcolor=#| || bgcolor=#| || bgcolor=#| || || || ||
|-
|  ||  || bgcolor=#| || bgcolor=#| || bgcolor=#| || || || ||
|-

See also 

 Tropical cyclones in 2004 and 2005
 List of Southern Hemisphere tropical cyclone seasons
 Atlantic hurricane seasons: 2004, 2005
 Pacific hurricane seasons: 2004, 2005
 Pacific typhoon seasons: 2004, 2005
 North Indian Ocean cyclone seasons: 2004, 2005

References

External links 

 
South Pacific cyclone seasons
Articles which contain graphical timelines
2004 SPac
2005 SPac